A special election was held in Cavite's 7th congressional district on February 25, 2023, to fill the district's vacant seat in the House of Representatives of the Philippines for the remainder of the 19th Congress. 

The vacancy arose when Jesus Crispin Remulla, the district's representative, opted to not take his seat in the 19th Congress to serve as the Secretary of Justice in the administration of President Bongbong Marcos. As a response, the House of Representatives passed a resolution urging the Commission on Elections to hold a special election to fill the vacancy.

Four candidates ran to fill the seat: Crispin Diego "Ping" Remulla, an incumbent board member from the 7th district; Melencio "Jun" De Sagun, a former mayor of Trece Martires; and independents Jose Angelito Aguinaldo and Michael Angelo Santos. Remulla won the election and succeeded his father.

Electoral system 
Each congressional district of the Philippines sends one representative to the House of Representatives. An election to the seat is via first-past-the-post, in which the candidate with the most votes, whether or not one has a majority, wins the seat. Per the Lone Candidate law (Republic Act 8295), should only one candidate file to run in the special election, the Commission on Elections (COMELEC) will declare that candidate as the winner and will no longer hold the election.

Background 

Cavite's 7th congressional district is composed of the province's de facto capital city of Trece Martires and the adjacent municipalities of Amadeo, Indang, and Tanza. The district's incumbent representative, Jesus Crispin Remulla, was unopposed in the 2022 general election, resulting in his reelection to a second term. Remulla is part of a political dynasty in Cavite; his younger brother, Jonvic, is currently the province's governor since 2019 and previously from 2010 to 2016. On May 23, 2022, Remulla was offered the position of Secretary of Justice under the incoming administration of then-president-elect Bongbong Marcos. He accepted the position, resigning his rights to the seat before his term as a representative began in order to assume the office.

Preparation 
After the 19th Congress of the Philippines convened in late July, it passed a resolution urging the Commission on Elections to hold a special election to fill the vacancy. Prior to the passing of the resolution, the commission stated that it was ready to hold a special election for the seat. John Rex Laudiangco, the acting COMELEC spokesperson, stated that the special election is to be held in March 2023, should the 2022 barangay and Sangguniang Kabataan elections should continue as planned, otherwise it would be held in December 2022 or January 2023. After the barangay elections were postponed to October 2023, COMELEC chairperson George Garcia stated that they will hold the election in February 2023. Speaker Martin Romualdez (Leyte–1st) served as the district's caretaker while the seat was vacant.

COMELEC Resolution No. 10848 set the timetable for the election. The filing of candidacies began on December 5, 2022, and ended on the following day. As multiple candidates were accepted by the commission, the election was conducted as scheduled. On election day, each precinct had at least ten voting machines. The printing of ballots began on January 11, 2023. It was reported that the commission set up four "technical hubs" as part of an "enhanced continuity plan" to ensure the fluidity of the elections. Laudiangco reported that each of the hubs “is capable of reconfiguring within one minute any secure digital (SD) card which may present issues”. There were 365,184 eligible voters for the election.

Candidates 
A total of four persons filed to fill the vacant seat. Among the four, one is a member of the National Unity Party, and three are independents.

The following have filed certificates of candidacies, formally notifying the commission that they are running.

 Jose Angelito Aguinaldo (Independent) 
 Crispin Diego "Ping" Remulla (NUP), incumbent Cavite Provincial Board member from the 7th district, and son of Jesus Crispin Remulla.
 Melencio "Jun" De Sagun (Independent), former mayor of Trece Martires.
 Michael Angelo Santos (Independent)

Campaign 
The campaign period for the special election candidates began on January 26, 2023, and concluded on February 23, 2023. Sagun launched his campaign by visiting four churches from the towns of Amadeo, Indang, Tanza, and Trece Matires.

All candidates signed a peace covenant at the Diocesan Shrine of Saint Augustine in Tanza on January 31, pledging to commit to a "peaceful election".

Sagun sued to disqualify Remulla days before the election, alleging public funds were used in his campaign. The commission clarified that a disqualification case does not remove that person from the ballot.  Remulla declined to comment on the petition, while his father had derided the petition as a "desperate measure" by Sagun. Nonetheless, the COMELEC has stated that the petition would "undergo the right process based on existing regulations.

Results 
The vote-counting for the election was done using an automated system. The COMELEC expected to proclaim a candidate as the winner in the morning following the election. George Garcia, chairman of the Commission on Elections, is a registered voter in this district and voted at Indang.

The National Citizens' Movement for Free Elections observed that while the administration of the election was orderly, paper jams were a common occurrence when voters fed their ballots to the voting machine, with voting machines shutting down also observed. The Philippine National Police noted that the exercise was peaceful and orderly.

On February 26, COMELEC proclaimed Remulla as the winner, taking just over two-thirds of the vote, with a voter turnout of less than half of voters. 

Results per city and municipality

Aftermath 
Remulla was sworn into office at the Batasang Pambansa Complex on February 28, three days following the election.

2022 election result

Prior special elections in Cavite 
 1909 Cavite's at-large Philippine Assembly district special election
 1925 Cavite's at-large House of Representatives district special election
 1929 Cavite's at-large House of Representatives district special election

References

External links
 House Resolution No. 3, Resolution Certifying to the Existence of a Vacancy in the House of Representatives, Particularly the Representative for the Seventh Legislative District of the Province of Cavite and Calling on the Commission on Elections to Fill the Vacancy Through a Special Election
 COMELEC Resolution No. 10848, Calendar of Activities and Periods of Certain Prohibited Acts in Connection With the February 25, 2023 Special Election in the 7th Legislative District, Province of Cavite

2023 elections in the Philippines
February 2023 events in the Philippines
2023 special election
2023 Cavite